Mark Dawson (born 1960) is a British-American entertainment manager 

Mark Dawson may also refer to:
 Mark Dawson (footballer) (born 1953), Australian rules footballer
 Mark Dawson (writer), English author